Who Loves You is an album by The Four Seasons. It was released in 1975 on Warner/Curb Records.

Background
The record introduced the new Four Seasons lineup which now included John Paiva (guitar), Don Ciccone (bass), Lee Shapiro (keyboards) and Gerry Polci (drums). Polci and Ciccone shared lead vocals with Frankie Valli, backed by producer Bob Gaudio and former Seasons bassist Joe Long.

The title song established the band as stars of the 1970s (peaking at #3 on the Billboard Hot 100 singles chart).  "December, 1963 (Oh, What a Night)", released in December 1975, spent six months on the charts and became the group's all-time best-selling single.

"Silver Star", the last single, also hit the Top 40, reaching #38 on the Hot 100 in 1976. All three singles from the album were successes in the UK, each placing in the top six positions of the UK Singles Chart.

Track listing
All songs written by Bob Gaudio and Judy Parker.

Charts
Album - Billboard (United States)

Singles - Billboard (United States)

References

1975 albums
The Four Seasons (band) albums
Albums produced by Bob Gaudio
Warner Records albums
Curb Records albums